Istiblennius pox, the scarface rockskipper, is a species of combtooth blenny found in the western Indian ocean. It can reach a maximum of  TL.

References

pox
Fish described in 1994
Taxa named by Victor G. Springer